Ical may refer to:

 Calendar (Apple), Apple's personal calendar application, formerly called iCal
 ical (Unix), a Tcl/tk calendar package
 iCalendar, a standardised calendar data exchange standard
 Aburizal Bakrie, a politician
 ICaL an ionic current through the L-type calcium channel